Theodore Edward Falda (January 2, 1920 – September 7, 1996) was an American professional basketball player. He played in the National Basketball League for the Hammond Ciesar All-Americans in three games and averaged 0.7 points per game.

A U.S. Army veteran, his basketball career was interrupted by World War II.

References

1920 births
1996 deaths
American men's basketball players
United States Army personnel of World War II
Basketball players from Indiana
Guards (basketball)
Hammond Ciesar All-Americans players
Indiana State Sycamores men's basketball players
People from Whiting, Indiana
Whiting High School alumni